Cities in the Dominican Republic, in accordance with the definition of urban population for purposes of the 2002 census, are the urban centers and seats (cabeceras literally heads) of municipalities (municipios singular municipio), the second level political and administrative subdivisions of the country, or of municipal districts (distritos municipales) within them.

Santo Domingo

Santo Domingo may refer to Santo Domingo de Guzmán, the sole municipality of the Distrito Nacional, or the metropolitan area of Santo Domingo spread over several municipalities, which as such is not an administrative or political entity. The 2002 census does not give data for metropolitan areas. Sources give different figures for the metropolitan areas population as of 2002 ranging from 1,887,586 to 2,054,516 or 1,840,000 (2000). As the law about the creation of the Santo Domingo province, split from the Distrito Nacional in 2001, does refer to the cities of Santo Domingo de Guzmán, Santo Domingo Este, Santo Domingo Norte and Santo Domingo Oeste as former parts of the city of Santo Domingo for comparison the aggregated population of this cities is given as Santo Domingo (metropolitan) in the following table.

Cities with population figures
The following is a table of cities with more than 20,000 inhabitants in the Dominican Republic. Population figures are as of the 2010 census.

Map

See also
Municipalities of the Dominican Republic

References

External links
  Oficina Nacional de Estadística, Statistics Portal of the Dominican Republic
  Oficina Nacional de Estadística, Maps about the administrative division of the Dominican Republic, downloadable in PDF format
  Federación Dominicana de Municipios - FEDOMU, Dominican federation of municipalities
World Gazetteer - Cities in the Dominican Republic
City Population - Dominican Republic

Dominican Republic, List of cities in the
 
Cities